Nationwide local elections for seats in municipality and county councils were held throughout Norway on 12 September 2011. Several municipalities also opened the polling booths on 11 September. For polling stations this meant that two elections, the municipal elections and the county elections ran concurrently. In addition, an advisory referendum was held in Aust-Agder to determine whether to merge the county with Vest-Agder.

Overall, the Conservative Party made the greatest gains, and the Labour Party also advanced and remained the largest party. On the other hand, the Progress Party and the Socialist Left Party suffered severe setbacks.

Term of office was 1 January 2012 until 31 December 2015.

New features

Electronic voting
Electronic voting over the internet was tried out in certain areas for the first time in Norway, with the ultimate goal of implementing full general availability for internet voting for the 2017 parliamentary elections.

Voting age of 16
In 2008, Magnhild Meltveit Kleppa, the Minister of Local Government and Regional Development announced that she was considering lowering the voting age from 18 to 16 in some municipalities as a trial. Three municipalities had applied for this in the 2007 election, but were turned down.

Parliament decided to give adolescents of age 16 and 17 the right to vote in selected municipalities. Of 143 applicants, 20 municipalities plus Longyearbyen on Svalbard were selected for the trial. The municipalities taking part in the trial are:
Marker in Østfold
Lørenskog in Akershus
Hamar in Hedmark
Vågå in Oppland
Sigdal in Buskerud
Re in Vestfold
Porsgrunn in Telemark
Grimstad in Aust-Agder
Mandal in Vest-Agder
Gjesdal and Stavanger in Rogaland
Austevoll in Hordaland
Luster in Sogn og Fjordane
Ålesund in Møre og Romsdal
Osen in Sør-Trøndelag
Namdalseid in Nord-Trøndelag
Tysfjord in Nordland
Gáivuotna – Kåfjord in Troms
Hammerfest and Kautokeino in Finnmark.

Election campaign

The issue of how and when the campaign would be conducted was affected by the 2011 Norway attacks on 22 July, which killed 77 people, most of them young supporters of the national Labour Party. On 24 July, the prime minister, the president of the Storting, and the parliamentary leaders of the political parties met for the first time to discuss rules for the political debates which would take place. Liv Signe Navarsete predicted that the election campaign would be considerably muted. On 25 July, the parliamentary leaders of the political parties agreed to delay the start of the campaign until mid-August and to cancel the school debates, because of the 22 July attacks. The school elections were, however, not cancelled.

Issues
One of the bigger issues for the local elections was a controversy about local hospitals in Møre og Romsdal, involving the cities Molde and Kristiansund which has hospitals today. The current Red-Green government postponed the planned building of a new hospital in Molde, instead considering moving vital functions to it from Kristiansund, the local population in Molde saw the postponement as a broken promise, while the locals in Kristiansund wanted a common hospital instead due to the latter issue. In early 2011, the Labour Party saw a shock opinion poll in Romsdal (which includes the city Molde) of a mere 5.8% support, which fell further in April to 1%. The handling of the controversy by the party, and particularly its Minister of Health and Care Services, Anne-Grete Strøm-Erichsen, was seen as the reason for the fall.

Polling

1This was the first poll since the attacks in Norway.

Results

Municipal elections

County elections

References

2011
2011
2011 elections in Europe
2011 in Norway
September 2011 events in Europe